Palmerston North is a parliamentary electorate, returning one Member of Parliament to the New Zealand House of Representatives. The current MP for Palmerston North is Tangi Utikere of the Labour Party. He has held this position since the 2020 election.

Profile
In December 1887, the House of Representatives voted to reduce its membership from general electorates from 91 to 70. The 1890 electoral redistribution used the same 1886 census data used for the 1887 electoral redistribution. In addition, three-member electorates were introduced in the four main centres. This resulted in a major restructuring of electorates, and Palmerston was one of four electorates to be first created for the 1890 election.

Palmerston North reached its current approximate size at the expense of the old Manawatu electorate in the lead up to the introduction of mixed-member proportional (MMP) voting in 1996. The boundaries of the Palmerston North electorate were last adjusted in the 2007 redistribution, when the electorate became fully urban and covered all of the urbanised part of Palmerston North City, with the towns in its orbit such as Ashhurst and Linton becoming part of the neighbouring electorate of Rangitīkei. To counter the population loss on the Manawatu River's left bank, the section of the city on the right bank, including the suburb of Milson, was moved in at the same time. No boundary adjustments were undertaken in the subsequent 2013/14 redistribution.

At the 2013 census, the Palmerston North electorate reported the highest share of those working in the retail trade industry (11.4%); those whose occupation was a community and personal service worker (10.9%); and those whose households used mains (natural) gas as a heating fuel. Among general electorates, Palmerston North had the second-highest share of those working in the education and training sector (11.8%), and people affiliated with the Brethren religious denomination (1.2%).

History
The electorate has been loyal to the Labour Party, not having elected a National MP since 1975, and having not re-elected a National MP since 1966.

The first representative of the Palmerston electorate was James Wilson. Wilson previously represented the  electorate until its abolition in 1890. In the 1899 election, Prime Minister Richard Seddon expressed his opposition to Pirani (who had previously stood for the Liberal Party) by endorsing William Thomas Wood, who came second that year.

The  was held under the Second Ballot Act, contested by three candidates. David Buick, Wood and W. Milverton received 2675, 2626 and 123 votes, respectively. As Buick did not receive an absolute majority, a second ballot was required. Buick standing for the Reform Party was again successful in the second round of voting and was thus elected.

Jimmy Nash, the sitting Mayor of Palmerston North, won the resulting by-election on 19 December 1918. He retired from the electorate at the 1946 election due to the deteriorating health of his wife.

The  was contested between Ormond Wilson for Labour and Mansford, whose relationship with the National Party was strained, since his 1935 election campaign had contributed to the defeat of Nash. So in 1946, the National Party decided not to stand a candidate, with Mansford running as an Independent. Wilson obtained a majority of 928 votes.

Wilson lost the subsequent election in  against Blair Tennent of the National Party. Skoglund contested the  against Bill Brown of the National Party and was confirmed by the voters. The  was contested by Brown against Labour's Joe Walding, with Brown holding a 259-vote majority. Brown died in office on 16 October 1967 at a function in Kaiapoi.

The resulting  was contested by five candidates: Walding (Labour Party), Gordon Cruden (National Party), John O'Brien (Social Credit Party), Goldingham (Progress) and P. J. Wedderspoon (Democratic Labour). Walding obtained a majority of 592 votes.

The Labour nomination was hotly contested and Trevor de Cleene, a good friend of Walding, was the most experienced candidate who put his name forward for selection, and despite concerns about his often controversial nature, he was nominated by the party. The candidate put forward by National was his old foe Brian Elwood, with whom he had worked on the Palmerston North City Council for many years, and against whom he lost the mayoralty contest in 1974. Elwood and de Cleene received 8315 and 10425 votes, respectively (representing 35.7% and 48.5% of the vote), with de Cleene thus entering Parliament in 1981.

Lees-Galloway defeated the National Party candidate, Malcolm Plimmer, with a majority of 1,117 votes. Lees-Galloway had a decreased majority of 2,212 votes over Naylor. Naylor was the lowest-ranked National MP who entered Parliament via their list. Ian Lees-Galloway retired before the 2020 election and was replaced by Tangi Utikere, the city's deputy mayor, as the electorate's MP.

Members of Parliament
Key

List MPs
Members of Parliament elected from party lists in elections where that person also unsuccessfully contested the Palmerston North electorate. Unless otherwise stated, all MPs terms began and ended at general elections.

Election results

2020 election

2017 election

2014 election

2011 election

Electorate (as at 26 November 2011): 43,524

2008 election

2005 election

1999 election
Refer to Candidates in the New Zealand general election 1999 by electorate#Palmerston North for a list of candidates.

1993 election

1990 election

1987 election

1984 election

1981 election

1978 election

1975 election

1972 election

 
 
 
 

 
 
 
 

Table footnotes:

1969 election

1967 by-election

1966 election

1963 election

1960 election

1957 election

1954 election

1951 election

1949 election

1946 election

1943 election

1938 election

1935 election

1931 election

1928 election

 
 
 
 
 

 

Table footnotes:

1925 election

1919 election

1918 by-election

1899 election

1890 election

Table footnotes

Notes

References

External links
The First Sixteen Members of Parliament for Palmerston North, lectures presented in association with the Manawatu Workers' Association (WEA) Mervyn Hancock, Palmerston North City Library
Electorate Profile  Parliamentary Library

New Zealand electorates
Politics of Manawatū-Whanganui
Palmerston North
1890 establishments in New Zealand